Roy H. Moore, Jr, (June 29, 1921-2 January 2018) was the former Olympic Wrestling Coach for Japan. After serving a number of years in the US Navy where he worked as a medic, including at the Battle of Iwo Jima.  Roy taught Judo at the Naval Training Center in San Diego.  His father, Roy Moore, was a famous Judo and Wrestling Coach.

References 

1921 births
2018 deaths
Japanese Olympic coaches
Judoka trainers
Wrestling coaches